Outside In is a 2020 picture book written by Deborah Underwood and illustrated by Cindy Derby. The book won a 2021 Caldecott Honor. The book explores the ways nature affects our everyday lives.

References 

2020 children's books
Caldecott Honor-winning works
American picture books